Clay's Ark (1984) is a novel by American science fiction author Octavia E. Butler. The last published of her Patternist series, the novel serves as a prequel that accounts for the arrival of the Clay Ark disease that leads to the evolution of clayarks, the mutants that threaten human survival in the series debut novel, 1976's Patternmaster, and 1978's Survivor, which Butler later disavowed.

Plot

The novel is set in a near-future dystopia in which most people must live in gated communities or in armed nomadic groups called "car families". The novel traces the experiences of Blake Maslin, a physician living in Southern California, and his sixteen-year-old twin daughters, Rane and Keira. Traveling across a Mojave desert, the three are kidnapped by Eli Doyle, the only survivor of Clay's Ark, a spaceship that made an emergency crash landing in the desert on its return from the first human mission to another planet. Eli is infected with an alien microorganism that gives him heightened sensory and physical powers, but also directs his actions toward its own survival and transmission. He has assembled a "family" on a small isolated ranch, hoping to slow or stop the microorganism's transmission, but the urge to reproduce is so strong that he seeks out other humans to add to his family. Many infected young men or older women die of the disease, but infected women survive to give birth to sphinx-like offspring—intelligent quadrupeds with extraordinary speed. The mutants, eventually (in novels set later in the series) called clayarks, see uninfected humans as food but can also spread the microorganism through their bite. Blake, Rane, and Keira are infected and Eli expects them to join in the reproductive project of the community. Blake and his daughters flee, only to be captured by a "car family" with much more violent tendencies. Blake and Rane, drawn by the microorganism to seek out food and sex, are fatally injured by the "car family." Rane is decapitated, but Blake manages to escape long enough to infect a long-haul truck driver, making inevitable the spread of the disease through the rest of the country and eventually the world. Keira, having been cured of leukemia by the microorganism, reluctantly agrees to participate and returns with Eli to the ranch family, pregnant with her own mutant child.

Characters
Major Characters
 Eli Doyle - The only survivor of Clay's Ark, the first crewed spaceship to reach another planet. He is a carrier of an alien virus. Eli is also a geologist.
 Blake Maslin - Keira's father, a doctor.
 Keira Maslin - The protagonist. She is battling leukemia.
 Rane Maslin - Keira's twin sister.

Minor Characters
 Andrew Zeriam - Lorene's boyfriend who commits suicide
 Badger - Clay Ark enemy
 Christian - Meda's brother
 Clay Dana - Inventor of the spaceship
 Gabriel Boyd - Meda's father
 Grove Kenyon - A doctor in Clay Ark
 Gwyn - Meda's sister-in-law
 Ingraham - Lupe's husband Eli's friend who is affected with the Clay Ark disease
 Jacob - Eli and Meda's Clay Ark son
 Jorah - Blake's dead wife
 Joseph - Meda and Eli's Clay Ark son
 Lorene - Meda's sister-in-law
 Lupe - Ingraham's wife
 Meda Boyd - Eli's lover
 Smoke - Clay Ark enemy
 Stephen Kaneshiro - The newest male member of the Clay Ark community
 Zera - Lorene and Andrew Zeriam's Clay Ark daughter

Reception 

Kirkus Reviews praised the novel's "strong, supple narrative with tense action."

Brian Stableford argues that the novel and other of her works such as Fledgling hover between parasitism and mutualistic symbiosis since the aliens may confer powers, but at a price.

References

Further reading 
 Bollinger, Laurel. "Symbiogenesis, Selfhood, and Science Fiction." Science Fiction Studies 37.1 [110] (2010): 34-53.
 Diehl, Laura. "American Germ Culture: Richard Matheson, Octavia Butler, and the (Political) Science of Individuality." Cultural Critique 85 (2013): 84-121.
 Ferreira, Maria Aline. "Symbiotic Bodies and Evolutionary Tropes in the Work of Octavia Butler." Science Fiction Studies 37.3 [112] (2010): 401-415. 
 Vint, Sherryl. "Becoming Other: Animals, Kinship, and Butler's Clay's Ark." Science Fiction Studies 32.2 [96] (2005): 281-300.

1984 American novels
Novels by Octavia Butler
1984 science fiction novels
1984 fantasy novels
Doubleday (publisher) books